General elections were held in Costa Rica on 6 February 2022, to elect the president, two vice-presidents, and all 57 deputies of the Legislative Assembly. As none of the presidential nominees obtained at least 40% of the votes, a runoff was held on 3 April 2022, between the top two candidates, José María Figueres and Rodrigo Chaves Robles.

Rodrigo Chaves Robles of the Social Democratic Progress Party, a former official of the World Bank and former Minister of Finance with an anti-establishment reputation, won 52.9% of the votes in the run-off ballot and was declared president-elect by the Electoral Tribunal. Rival candidate and former president José Maria Figueres of the National Liberation Party received 47.1% of the votes and conceded defeat.

Electoral system 
The President of Costa Rica is elected using a modified two-round system in which a candidate must receive at least 40% of the vote to win in the first round; if no candidate wins in the first round, a runoff is held between the two candidates with most votes.

The 57 members of the Legislative Assembly are elected using closed list proportional representation through the largest remainder method from seven multi-member constituencies with between four and 19 seats, which are based on the seven provinces. Party lists were required to alternate between male and female candidates, with parties also required to have three or four of their seven regional lists headed by a female candidate.

Background
In the previous election, a second electoral round was held, owing to the fact that neither political party obtained 40% of the vote. This was only the third time in history that a second round had been held. The two candidates with the most support were the then-deputy, journalist, preacher, and Christian music singer Fabricio Alvarado Muñoz of the conservative National Restoration party, and the former Minister of Labor, journalist and writer Carlos Alvarado Quesada of the ruling Citizens' Action. The election was marked by social and religious issues that included issues such as same-sex marriage, the secular state, and sex education. Carlos Alvarado was the winner in the second round by a wide margin.

The Constitution of Costa Rica prohibits the incumbent president from serving consecutive terms, making the current president, Carlos Alvarado Quesada, ineligible to run in 2022. Additionally, government ministers and the directors or managers of autonomous institutions must resign twelve months before the election is held if they wish to run for the presidency or vice-presidency.

Candidates

Presidential candidates 
The Supreme Electoral Court approved twenty-five parties and their nominated candidates for the presidency. The ballot printing process started in December 2021, with the candidates shown on the following table.

Declined party inscriptions
 Costa Rican Renewal Party: Nominated Camilo Rodríguez Chaverri for the presidency, but their documentation was incomplete and the party was not allowed to run.
 Democratic Force: Former Libertarian vice presidential candidate and television presenter Viviam Quesada also announced her presidential candidacy through Democratic Force. The party was the only that submitted the documentation on physical paper printouts, and some of the required documentation was missing so the party was not allowed to run.

Primaries and party conferences

Citizens' Action Party

The National Assembly of the Citizen Action Party held face-to-face assemblies, between April and July, to renew its structures in the country's cantons and provinces.

Lawmaker Welmer Ramos was elected in the primaries, winning by a narrow margin over fellow deputy Carolina Hidalgo and former Sports Minister Hernán Solano.

National Liberation Party

The National Liberation Party, the main opposition force, held its primary, known as the National Liberation Convention, on 6 June 2021, electing former President José María Figueres Olsen as a nominee. Political scientist Claudio Alpízar Otoya, former deputy and two-time presidential candidate Rolando Araya Monge, and Carlos Benavides Jiménez and Roberto Thompson Chacón,   deputies for the 2018–2022 period, also participated in this process. Rolando Araya Monge quit the National Liberation Party and joined A Just Costa Rica as the presidential candidate.

Social Christian Unity Party

The Social Christian Unity Party held its National Convention on 27 June 2021. Erwen Masís Castro and Pedro Muñoz Fonseca, deputies for the 2018–2022 period, and the former vice president (2002–2006) Lineth Saborío Chaverri, participated in the process, and Saborío was elected as the presidential candidate.

Other parties/coalitions
Several former candidates who participated in the process have already announced their interest in being candidates again. Notably, in most cases, these candidates resigned from the parties for which they tried to obtain the presidency and began the processes of founding new political groups.

 A Just Costa Rica: Independent deputy Dragos Dolanescu Valenciano announced the creation of a new political formation called A Just Costa Rica after his departure from the Social Christian Republican Party following an accusation lodged by the party authorities against him for corruption. Although he announced that he would be measuring the popular support for a possible candidacy Rolando Araya Monge was selected as the presidential candidate for the party; he finished in second place in the PLN primary.
 Costa Rican Social Democratic Movement: Physician Roulan Jiménez Chavarría will run for president together with Rubén Vargas, a taxi service representative.
 Social Democratic Progress: The former Minister of Finance of the Alvarado Quesada administration and former World Bank official, Rodrigo Chaves Robles, has held meetings with different sectors and representatives of seven political parties, including the Republican Social Christian and National Integration parties to propose a programmatic proposal and a possible electoral coalition in which, presumably, he could be the candidate. According to Chaves, "I've told them that, first of all, you cannot talk about a long trip if you do not have a vehicle. Secondly, you can much less talk about the driver of a vehicle that does not exist. But I agree with them that in this country, approximately 60 percent of the voters do not find representation in any of the existing parties or feel the need to support them." Chaves affirmed at the end of February 2021 that there are seven participating parties, three already registered: Republican Social Christian, National Integration (with parliamentary representation) and Social Democratic Progress Party, alongside four in the process of registration: United for Costa Rica, Our Town and the Costa Rican Pacific Union and that they have not defined the candidates for president and vice-presidents. At the end of May, the Republican Social Christian Party and Chaves announced their separation, affirming ideological incompatibilities and breach of agreements, including the candidacy of two-time Republican candidate Rodolfo Hernández for deputy for San José. In July, Chaves announced his candidacy with the recently founded Social Democratic Progress Party.
 Liberal Union: Former Libertarian Movement leader Otto Guevara left the Libertarian Movement after the party went bankrupt and in economic disarray, and founded the Liberal Union Party. The former deputy and former Libertarian presidential candidate Federico Guillermo Malavassi Calvo announced his presidential nomination with Guevara as deputy candidate on the party list.
 Libertarian Movement: Lawyer and financier with a neoliberal tendency, Carlos Valenciano Kamer, known for suing Célimo Guido during the demonstrations of the National Rescue Movement at the end of 2020, was announced as a candidate by the libertarian party, but he quit some months after. The party nominated Luis Alberto Cordero Arias as the presidential candidate.
 National Encounter: Former deputy Óscar Campos, organizer of blockades and protests against the government in 2018, founded this party.
 National Restoration: This party, that held an important role in the last election, nominated the former president of the Legislative Assembly, Eduardo Cruickshank. 
 New Generation Party: Sergio Mena Díaz would be repeating for the third time the presidential candidacy with a double nomination for deputy also for the third time for New Generation. 
 New Republic: Fabricio Alvarado, who was the first place of the first round and runner-up of the previous election, announced his separation from the party for which he was a deputy and candidate, and create the New Republic Party, although he assures that this would be a secular and non-Christian party unlike its predecessor.
 Our People: The former Minister of the Presidency of Costa Rica and former candidate (twice) of the Social Christian Unity Party Rodolfo Piza Rocafort announced that he would be participating but this time for the Our People Party, a provincial party in the process of being constituted on a national scale. Our People Party was a provincial political party founded mostly by former Social Christian Unity Party members and converted to the national level.
 Social Christian Republican Party: The party considered the former minister Rodrigo Chaves as presidential candidate and also former President Rafael Ángel Calderón Fournier was asked to run, but he declined, arguing for health reasons. Nomination finally went to three-time candidate Rodolfo Hernández who was also a candidate in 2014 and 2018.
 United We Can: Natalia Díaz Quintana, former deputy and former presidential candidate within the Libertarian Movement created a new liberal party called United We Can. Díaz had previously resigned from the Libertarian Movement and even gave her adhesion to the candidate of the National Liberation Party Antonio Álvarez Desanti in the 2018 election. Diaz was ratified as presidential nominee on 26 June.

Failed coalitions proposal
As of the legal deadline for the inscription of alliances, 8 August 2021, no party entered a coalition, but some attempts were made by some of the right-wing parties.

Attempted coalitions
At the beginning of 2020, the presidents of Social Christian Unity Party, Christian Democratic Alliance and Liberal Union began negotiations for the creation of a conservative-liberal right-wing coalition with the self-proclaimed goal of preventing a third government of the Citizen Action Party. Although Natalia Díaz Quintana of Unidos Podemos was invited, she declined to participate, preferring to fight the elections alone. The participation of Eliécer Feinzaig Mintz of the Progressive Liberal Party in the negotiations was reported in principle, but their representatives later denied it.

The proposal for a Christian-liberal coalition was also promoted by former Social Christian president Miguel Ángel Rodríguez Echeverría. However, the proposal was rejected in the National Assembly of the Social Christian Unity Party.

Coalition for Change
On 21 June 2021, Cartago mayor Mario Redondo Poveda and former Deputy Minister of Transportation Eliécer Feinzaig Mintz, respectively the presidents of the Christian Democratic Alliance and Liberal Progressive Party, announced the "Coalition for Change". This would be the first coalition of right-wing parties to participate in a presidential election since the Unity Coalition in 1978, and the first overall since United Left in 2006.

On 25 June Redondo individually abandoned the Coalition due to questionings after it was made public that he held secret meetings with one of the companies involved in the Cochinilla judicial case scandal.

Personalities that attempted to run 
 Juan Diego Castro Fernández: One of the first to make the announcement was criminal lawyer and former Justice Minister Juan Diego Castro, who announced the creation of a new party called "Reconstruction" after his unfriendly break with the National Integration Party. Castro announced in January 2021, he was cancelling the process of forming the party due to difficulties in the registration process, formally requesting the Supreme Electoral Tribunal for the filing. In 2021 Castro Fernández confirmed to Teletica that he would be a presidential candidate for the second time, although he did not clarify by which group, assuring that he is evaluating being one by a party or coalition. He only completely ruled out the return to being one by National Integration, from which he had an unfriendly exit.

Campaign

Voters' concerns included high unemployment (nearly 20 percent), rising costs of living, corruption and, to a lesser extent, immigration.

The Citizens' Action Party, in power since 2014, has become largely unpopular and suffers from internal divisions. Its candidate, Welmer Ramos, had only low voting intentions in the opinion polls.

Fabricio Alvarado ran again. Supported by conservative evangelicals, he focused his campaign on societal issues, denouncing "gender ideology" in education and alleged infringements on religious freedoms. He promised not to raise taxes and was expected to benefit from the resentment of some Costa Ricans towards traditional political parties, which some consider corrupt.

José María Figueres, the candidate of the National Liberation Party, was president from 1994 to 1998 and is the son of José Figueres Ferrer, who was president several times. In office, he eliminated social welfare programs. He promised economic reforms, including pension reform, to reduce the deficit and unemployment. He also proposed to encourage the oil industry. However, he was weakened by a corruption case dating back to 2004.

Rodrigo Chaves Robles, the candidate of the Social Democratic Progress Party, served as Minister Of Finance from 2019 to 2020. As part of his campaign, he sought to combat corruption by punishing those who do not report acts of misconduct. He stated he was in favor of transparency between the government and the press, universities and citizens, and he planned to foster it through a daily report of the activities carried out by public institutions. His plan regarding unemployment involved encouraging more women to join the workforce and to raise the number of STEM graduates in response to the growing demand. He also supported bilingual education and welcomed foreign businesses in Costa Rica. To top off his campaign, he proposed a five-step plan to lower the cost of living. The five step plan was removing taxes from basic food and household items, lowering the price of rice, lowering the price of electricity, eliminating monopolies and supporting farmers to import more efficient agrochemicals.

Lineth Saborio, supported by the centre-right Social Christian Unity Party, was vice-president of Costa Rica from 2002 to 2006 under President Abel Pacheco. Her proposals included reducing taxes and defending the agreement with the International Monetary Fund (IMF) signed by the government.

José María Villalta represented the Broad Front left-wing coalition. He emphasized the fight against climate change, workers' rights and social programs. He advocated for tax reform, a sharp increase in social spending, strengthening labor rights, energy transition and defense of LGBTQ rights. He was heavily attacked for his support of Nicaragua and Venezuela.

Themes

Social

COVID-19 pandemic

The COVID-19 pandemic, which, as of February 2021, has resulted in more than 2,800 deaths in Costa Rica, has had significant socioeconomic effects in the country that were expected to influence the presidential elections. An example is unemployment, which, influenced by the effects of the pandemic, increased to 21.9% by October 2020.4 According to a study by the Center for Research and Political Studies (CIEP) of the University of Costa Rica, 27.45% of the 877 people consulted in the study throughout the national territory identified unemployment as the main problem in the country in the context of the pandemic.

Popular protests
One of the most controversial aspects of the Alvarado Quesada administration was the approval by the Legislative Assembly of the Law for the Strengthening of Public Finances, popularly known as the Fiscal Plan, which was opposed by both the right and the left, but it was supported by the benches of the majority parties; PLN, PAC and PUSC (ranging from center-right to center-left). Opposition to the project led to the 2018 Costa Rican union strike, one of the largest in recent history, but which did not have the effect of stopping the project.

The opposition to the tax reform, however, generated future protests coupled with other issues of discontent from specific sectors. In mid-2019, protests were raised by fishermen, truck drivers and high school students, the latter calling for the resignation of the Minister of Education Edgar Mora and closing national roads. The students demanded, among other things, the end of the FARO tests and the reestablishment of the traditional high school tests, improvement in infrastructure and the departure of Mora, who effectively resigned on 2 July 2019. The protests were supported by allies as dissimilar as the union movements traditionally associated with the left of leaders such as the unionist Albino Vargas as well as the ultra-conservative neo-Pentecostal political movement led by the presidential candidate Fabricio Alvarado and by far-right movements.

Migration and xenophobia
The first potential candidate to make the issue of migration his own was Sergio Mena Díaz of the right-wing extra-parliamentary New Generation party, who, among other things, proposes to reform the Constitution to eliminate ius soli (birthright citizenship, which allows anyone to be Costa Rican by birth by being born in Costa Rican territory). The bill earned Mena harsh criticism who was even accused of being a "fascist" by the left-wing deputy José María Villalta.

Cannabis legalization
In April 2021, the parliamentary caucus of the Citizen's Action Party proposed through a bill the legalization of the production, consumption and sale of cannabis and its derivatives, including for recreational use and not just medicinal. Conservative legislators opposed the measure. If approved, the bill would establish the power of the ministries of Health, Agriculture and Livestock, Economy, Industry and Commerce and Foreign Trade to regulate production, transformation, industrialization and commercialization activities, and It would give the government the power to issue licenses for production and commercialization as well as possible closures.

Corruption
On 17 February 2020, the Alvarado government created the Presidential Data Analysis Unit (UPAD) through decree number 41996-MP-Mideplan, the same office that would be quickly dissolved days later, on 23 February, due to its controversial origins, performance and goals. The UPAD requested personal information about citizens from different government entities since 2019, so the Legislative Assembly initiated an investigation on 26 February 2020. On 28 February 2020, the Office of the Attorney General of the Republic carried out a search of a Presidential House where he collects electronic devices as evidence, including President Carlos Alvarado's cell phone and laptop.

During 2021, it was discovered that since 2015 an alleged organized drug trafficking group had meetings at the legislative headquarters with some thirteen legislators and former legislators in their offices.

On Monday, 14 June 2021, the Judicial Investigation Agency carried out 57 raids on homes, construction companies and government institutions, including the second raid on the Presidential House during the Carlos Alvarado administration, in which documents were confiscated, and 30 people were arrested. The investigation was nicknamed the Caso Cochinilla (Woodlouse case) in reference to the parasite.

This judicial investigation case revolves around a network of corruption and bribery between construction companies (MECO, H Solís, Montedes and others) and officials of the National Council of Roads (Conavi), the entity in charge of the development of highways in the country, which publishes the contracting posters and administers their tenders. President Alvarado ordered a full investigation of the Ministry and suspended all contracts with the involved companies.

Opinion polls

Results

President

By province
First round

Second round

Abroad vote
First round

Second round

Legislative Assembly

By province

Aftermath
Rodrigo Chaves Robles of the Social Democratic Progress Party, a former official of the World Bank and former Minister of Finance with an anti-establishment reputation, won 52.9% of the votes in the run-off ballot, and was declared president-elect by the electoral tribunal. Rival candidate and former president José Maria Figueres of the National Liberation Party received 47.1% of the votes. Speaking to supporters in San José, Chaves said he accepted his victory with humility, and urged Figueres to help him move the country forward. Figueres quickly conceded defeat after results came in, telling supporters: "I congratulate Rodrigo Chaves, and I wish him the best." On Twitter, incumbent president Carlos Alvarado Quesada said he had called to congratulate Chaves and pledged an orderly handover of power.

Reactions 
United States congratulated Rodrigo Chaves Robles on his election as Costa Rica's next president. In a statement, it added, "we also congratulate Costa Ricans for participating in and carrying out an electoral process consistent with Costa Rica's strong democratic traditions. Costa Rica represents a beacon of democracy in the Americas and the world, and our bilateral relations remain rooted in shared democratic values embracing freedom, inclusivity, and respect for human rights. We look forward to strengthening ties between our nations to advance common interests, including humane migration management, protecting the environment, and working with democratic partners in the region toward a more secure, prosperous, and democratic hemisphere."

References

2022 elections in Central America
General election
April 2022 events in North America
2022 general
February 2022 events in North America